Donna K. Arnett is an American epidemiologist and clinical research nurse. After having a stroke at the age of 27, she began focusing her research on epidemiology. In 2019, Arnett was named a World Expert in Hypertension by Expertscape after being in the top 0.076 per cent of scholars writing about hypertension over the previous ten years.

Early life and education
Arnett was born and raised in London, Kentucky. She obtained her Bachelor of Nursing and Master's degree from the University of South Florida College of Public Health and began working in the neonatal intensive care unit in Tampa, Florida. While working as a nurse, Arnett had a stroke at the age of 27 due to a genetic condition but experienced doubtfulness due to her age. Although she drove herself to work, four hours later she was sent to the emergency room for treatment. Following her stroke, Arnett enrolled at UNC Gillings School of Global Public Health for a doctorate degree in epidemiology.

Career
Upon obtaining her PhD, Arnett accepted a faculty position at the University of Minnesota in 1994. During her tenure at the institution, she oversaw the Minnesota Heart Survey, a population-based study whose results brought about policy changes. She left Minnesota in 2004 to become an associate dean at the University of Alabama at Birmingham's School of Public Health. As a professor and chair of the Department of Epidemiology in the UAB School of Public Health, Arnett became the first epidemiologist elected president of the American Heart Association (AHA).

Arnett left UAB in 2015 to become the Dean of the University of Kentucky College of Public Health. While serving in this role, she was the recipient of the AHA's 2017 Population Research Prize "for insightful research successfully blending the basic molecular sciences with population studies to produce a highly relevant new understanding of major aspects of cardiovascular disease including risk prediction, hypertension and heart failure." Arnett was also recognized as a World Expert in Hypertension by Expertscape after being in the top 0.076 per cent of scholars writing about hypertension over the previous ten years. During the COVID-19 pandemic, Arnett wrote in KyForward.com, Kentucky's Online Newspaper, to encourage Kentucky citizens to vaccinate. She was also named to the National Academy of Sciences Committee Examining Use of Dogs in Biomedical Research.

References

External links

Living people
People from London, Kentucky
University of South Florida alumni
UNC Gillings School of Global Public Health alumni
University of Minnesota faculty
University of Alabama at Birmingham faculty
University of Kentucky faculty
Women deans (academic)
American university and college faculty deans
American women epidemiologists
American epidemiologists
Year of birth missing (living people)
21st-century American women